is a Japanese monochrome anime television series created by Fumio Hisamatsu, who also served as the series character designer. When the series was broadcast in other countries, some episodes were redone in color, and the Japanese rebroadcasts use these color episodes.

Plot
Super Jetter comes from the 30th century, but after fighting the villain known as "Jaguar" he ends up in a time machine that sends them back to the 20th century. He meets a young girl named Kaoru whose father is the Secretary of International Science Bureau of Investigation, Saigou Mizushima. With his super abilities, Jetter is asked by Mr. Mizushima to help keep peace in the 20th century. Jetter has superior intelligence and strength compared to those of the 20th century. He has futuristic abilities such as being able to stop time for 30 seconds, an anti-gravity belt, infrared goggles, is bulletproof, and has a paralyzing gun.

Characters
 Jetter (Voiced by: Osamu Ichikawa)
 Kaoru Mizushima (Voiced by: Minori Matsushima)
 Jaguar (Voiced by: Kei Taguchi)
 Saigou Mizushima (Voiced by: Kazuo Kumakura)
 Spider (Voiced by: Tadashi Nakamura)

Release
The series was released on VHS in the 1980s, but only the first 41 episodes. There was another short-lived VHS release that was only two VHS and contained three of the color episodes. A 13 disc Laser-disc version was released in 1993. A complete DVD version was released in 2002.

References

1966 Japanese television series endings
1960s time travel television series
Television series set in the 20th century
Fiction set in the 30th century
Japanese children's animated action television series
Japanese children's animated space adventure television series
Shōnen manga
Japanese time travel television series